Roderick Hood (born October 3, 1981) is a former American football cornerback in the National Football League (NFL). He was signed by the Philadelphia Eagles as an undrafted free agent in 2003 and also played for the Arizona Cardinals, Tennessee Titans and St. Louis Rams. He played college football for the Auburn Tigers at Auburn University.

Early years
Hood attended Carver High School in Columbus, Georgia and was a letterman in football, basketball, and track. In track, his 4x100 relay team went to the state finals, and he helped lead the basketball team to the state finals.

College career
Hood played college football at Auburn University and played in 47 games (18 starts) and finished his career with five interceptions and 106 tackles. He was also a star return specialist, returning 51 punts for 571 yards (11.2 yards per punt return) and averaged 19.9 yards on kick returns. Hood returned to Auburn following his NFL career and graduated. He completed the requirements and was awarded a Baccalaureate Degree in Public Administration following Auburn's 2014-15 academic Year.

Professional career

Pre-draft
Height: 5-11. Weight: 198. 40 Yard Dash: 4.47; Bench Press: 13; Vertical Jump: 34"; Broad Jump: 10'5"

Philadelphia Eagles
Hood signed as an undrafted free agent with the Philadelphia Eagles in 2003. He signed a three-year $910,000 contract with the Eagles and as a rookie he tied for fifth on the Eagles in special teams tackles with 21. As the nickel cornerback, he recorded four tackles and recovered a fumble and recorded his first career interception. Hood finished 2004 with 32 tackles and a team-high three fumble recoveries on defense. Following an injury to starter Lito Sheppard, Hood worked his way into the starting lineup in 2005 where he had three interceptions and 41 tackles and was named to USA Today’s “2005 All-Joe” team. In 2006, he played ten games with four starts and recorded 18 tackles after he signed a one-year, $1.573 million tender to remain with the Eagles for the 2006 season.

Arizona Cardinals
Following the 2006 season, Hood left the Eagles in free agency and signed a five-year $15 million contract with the Arizona Cardinals where he was the starting cornerback in 2007 and 2008. In the 2007 season, Hood had his best season with five interceptions and two of them were returned for touchdowns. Hood started all 16 games and his 196 return yards on five interceptions were second best in the NFL this season behind Antrel Rolle’s 231 return yards. In 2008 Hood played 15 games with 14 starts and intercepted one pass as the Arizona Cardinals advanced to the Super Bowl.

Hood was released by the Cardinals on April 28, 2009. Hood signed with the Cleveland Browns and later signed with the Chicago Bears during the offseason, but failed to make either team's final 53-man roster.

Tennessee Titans
Hood was signed by the Tennessee Titans on October 15, 2009. In his first two games with the Titans, Hood recorded 6 tackles and 1 interception for 17 yards on November 1, 2009 against the Jacksonville Jaguars.

During preparations for the 2010 season Hood tore his ACL and was placed on injured reserve for the remainder of the season. He became a free agent at the end of the season.

St. Louis Rams
On September 27, 2011, Hood signed with the St. Louis Rams.

References

External links
ESPN Player Profile

1981 births
Living people
Players of American football from Columbus, Georgia
American football cornerbacks
Auburn Tigers football players
Philadelphia Eagles players
Arizona Cardinals players
Cleveland Browns players
Chicago Bears players
Tennessee Titans players
St. Louis Rams players
George Washington Carver High School (Columbus, Georgia) alumni